Viña 2020 is the 61st edition of the International Song Festival of Viña del Mar, held between 23 and 28 February 2020, being conducted by Maria Luisa Godoy and Martin Cárcamo. It is organized by Televisión Nacional de Chile, Canal 13 and Fox Channel Latin America.

That year's edition is distinguished from others because it was held, despite the tense social and political environment experienced in Chile since October 2019, so the event was fully marked by the 2019 Chilean Crisis.

Artists 

As usual, the routines were divided into two types of entertainment: singing and comedy.

Singers 

 Ricky Martin.
 Pedro Capó.
 Mon Laferte.
 Francisca Valenzuela.
 Ana Gabriel.
 Pimpinela.
 Pablo Alborán.
 Luciano Pereyra.
 Maroon 5
 Alexandre Pires.
  Ozuna.
 Denise Rosenthal.
 Noche de Brujas.

Comedians 

 Stefan Kramer.
 Javiera Contador.
 Ernesto Belloni.
 Fusión Humor.
 Paul Vásquez.
 Pedro Ruminot.

Competitions 
As every year, there is an international song competition, an international one, aimed at various musical themes of each country, and a folkloric competition, with a song typical of the folklore of the country represented. The winner is awarded with the most recognized prize of the contest: "La Gaviota de Plata".

This year, the results were as follows:

International 
 1st place:: , Vicente Cifuentes «Chillán».
 2nd place:: , Johann Vera: «Perdón».
 3rd place:: , Fran Vázquez: «Bailo con mi sombra».

Folkloric 
 1st place:: , Nahuel Pennisi: «Avanzar».
 2nd place:: , Soledad del Río: «Somos el Paraíso».
 3rd place:: , Paula Arenas: «Buena para nada» .

Controversies

Political humor 
Chilean comedians such as the "Fusión Humor" quartet or the humorist and imitator Stefan Kramer made comic routines laughing at controversial situations within the political-social landscape lived in Chile at the end of 2019, and early 2020. The organization was accused of censorship of humorous routines that made fun of politicians and the Government of Chile, mainly of the current president Sebastián Piñera.

Singer declarations 
Popular Mexican singer-songwriter Ana Gabriel and Chilean singer Mon Laferte made political statements during their presentations. The Mon Laferte spoke about a police request for her to clarify her previous and severe accusation made against police in Chile during the protests. For its part, the Mexican singer acknowledged that she was not interested in politics, but that she was sorry that the people were harmed, comparing the situation in Chile with countries such as Nicaragua, Mexico or Venezuela.

Maroon 5 
On 27 February 2020, the American rock band Maroon 5 performed. The presentation, which began 29 minutes late, was listed as "mediocre" by the specialized press, inside and outside Chile. The BBC said that Adam Levine performed the songs with "lack of energy and out of tune", adding that the disappointment of the fans increased when videos were leaked, when he was leaving the stage, showing him angry and saying that "they were deceived", that it was a concert for television, and that Viña del Mar is a "shitty city". That created an atmosphere of rejection inside and outside of his fans who were very upset by the words of disrespect from the band's leader. Levine later posted on Instagram to apologized for the incident and the band said it had experienced technical difficulties with the audio feed to Levine's ear pieces.

References 

2020 in Chile
Viña del Mar International Song Festival
February 2020 events in Chile
2019–2020 Chilean protests